Emotional dysregulation is a range of emotional responses that do not lie within a desirable scope of emotive response, considering the stimuli.

Emotional dysregulation can be associated with an experience of early psychological trauma, brain injury, or chronic maltreatment (such as child abuse, child neglect, or institutional neglect/abuse), and associated disorders such as reactive attachment disorder.  Emotional dysregulation may be present in people with psychiatric disorders such as attention deficit hyperactivity disorder, autism spectrum disorders,  bipolar disorder, borderline personality disorder, complex post-traumatic stress disorder, and fetal alcohol spectrum disorders. In such cases as borderline personality disorder and complex post-traumatic stress disorder, hypersensitivity to emotional stimuli causes a slower return to a normal emotional state. This is manifested biologically by deficits in the frontal cortices of the brain.

Possible manifestations of emotional dysregulation include extreme tearfulness, angry outbursts or behavioral outbursts such as destroying or throwing objects, aggression towards self or others, and threats to kill oneself.  Emotional dysregulation can lead to behavioral problems and can interfere with a person's social interactions and relationships at home, in school, or at place of employment.

Etymology
The word "dysregulation" is a neologism created by combining the prefix "dys-" to "regulation".  According to Webster's Dictionary, dys- has various roots and is of Greek origin.  With Latin and Greek roots, it is akin to Old English tō-, te- "apart" and in Sanskrit dus- "bad, difficult." It is frequently confused with the spelling "disregulation" with the prefix "dis" meaning "the opposite of" or "absence of"; while "disregulation" refers to the removal or absence of regulation, "dysregulation" refers to ways of regulating that are inappropriate or ineffective.

Child psychopathology
There are links between child emotional dysregulation and later psychopathology. For instance, ADHD symptoms are associated with problems with emotional regulation, motivation, and arousal. One study found a connection between emotional dysregulation at 5 and 10 months, and parent-reported problems with anger and distress at 18 months. Low levels of emotional regulation behaviors at 5 months were also related to non-compliant behaviors at 30 months. While links have been found between emotional dysregulation and child psychopathology, the mechanisms behind how early emotional dysregulation and later psychopathology are related are not yet clear.

Symptoms
Smoking, self-harm, eating disorders, and addiction have all been associated with emotional dysregulation. Somatoform disorders may be caused by a decreased ability to regulate and experience emotions or an inability to express emotions in a positive way. Individuals who have difficulty regulating emotions are at risk for eating disorders and substance abuse as they use food or substances as a way to regulate their emotions. Emotional dysregulation is also found in people who have an increased risk of developing a mental disorder, particularly an affective disorder such as depression or bipolar disorder.

Early childhood
Research has shown that failures in emotional regulation may be related to the display of acting out,  externalizing disorders, or behavior problems. When presented with challenging tasks, children who were found to have defects in emotional regulation (high-risk) spent less time attending to tasks and more time throwing tantrums or fretting than children without emotional regulation problems (low-risk). High-risk children had difficulty with self-regulation and had difficulty complying with requests from caregivers and were more defiant. Emotional dysregulation has also been associated with childhood social withdrawal.

Internalizing behaviors
Emotional dysregulation in children can be associated with internalizing behaviors including
exhibiting emotions too intense for a situation
difficulty calming down when upset
difficulty decreasing negative emotions 
being less able to calm themselves
difficulty understanding emotional experiences
becoming avoidant or aggressive when dealing with negative emotions 
experiencing more negative emotions

Externalizing behaviors
Emotional dysregulation in children can be associated with externalizing behaviors including
exhibiting more extreme emotions 
difficulty identifying emotional cues 
difficulty recognizing their own emotions
focusing on the negative
difficulty controlling their attention 
being impulsive
difficulty decreasing their negative emotions 
difficulty calming down when upset

Protective factors
Early experiences with caregivers can lead to differences in emotional regulation. The responsiveness of a caregiver to an infant's signals can help an infant regulate their emotional systems. Caregiver interaction styles that overwhelm a child or that are unpredictable may undermine emotional regulation development. Effective strategies involve working with a child to support developing self-control such as modeling a desired behavior rather than demanding it.

The richness of an environment that a child is exposed to helps the development of emotional regulation. An environment must provide appropriate levels of freedom and constraint. The environment must allow opportunities for a child to practice self-regulation. An environment with opportunities to practice social skills without overstimulation or excessive frustration helps a child develop self-regulation skills.

Substance use 
Several variables have been explored to explain the connection between emotional dysregulation and substance use in young adults, such as child maltreatment, cortisol levels, family environment, and symptoms of depression and anxiety. Vilhena-Churchill and Goldstein (2014) explored the association between childhood maltreatment and emotional dysregulation. More severe childhood maltreatment was found to be associated with an increase in difficulty regulating emotion, which in turn was associated with a greater likelihood of coping by using marijuana. Kliewer et al. (2016) performed a study on the relationship between negative family emotional climate, emotional dysregulation, blunted anticipatory cortisol, and substance use in adolescents. Increased negative family emotional climate was found to be associated with high levels of emotional dysregulation, which was then associated with increased substance use. Girls were seen to have blunted anticipatory cortisol levels, which was also associated with an increase in substance use. Childhood events and family climate with emotional dysregulation are both factors seemingly linked to substance use. Prosek, Giordano, Woehler, Price, and McCullough (2018) explored the relationship between mental health and emotional regulation in collegiate illicit substance users. Illicit drug users reported higher levels of depression and anxiety symptoms. Emotional dysregulation was more prominent in illicit drug users in the sense that they had less clarity and were less aware of their emotions when the emotions were occurring.

Treatment

While cognitive behavioral therapy is the most widely prescribed treatment for such psychiatric disorders, a commonly prescribed psychotherapeutic treatment for emotional dysregulation is dialectical behavioral therapy, a psychotherapy which promotes the use of mindfulness, a concept called dialectics, and emphasis on the importance of validation and maintaining healthy behavioral habits.

When diagnosed as being part of ADHD, norepinephrine and dopamine reuptake inhibitors such as methylphenidate (Ritalin) and atomoxetine are often used. A few studies have also showed promise in terms of non-pharmacological treatments for people with ADHD and emotional problems, although the research is limited and requires additional inquiry.

See also 

 Adrenal insufficiency
 Attachment theory
 Blunted affect
 Borderline personality disorder
 Complex post-traumatic stress disorder
 Conduct disorder
 Emotional self-regulation
 Epigenetics of anxiety and stress–related disorders
 Transgenerational stress inheritance
 Externalizing disorders
 Labile affect
 Oppositional defiant disorder
 Spiritual crisis
 The WAVE Trust

References 

Borderline personality disorder
Child abuse
Emotional issues
Institutional abuse
Mood disorders
Psychological abuse
Symptoms and signs of mental disorders